Ararat Quarterly (1959–2008) was an international quarterly of literature, history, popular culture and the arts published in English

The quarterly was published by the Armenian General Benevolent Union (AGBU) in New York, NY.

References

Armenian General Benevolent Union
Armenian journals
Armenian-American history
Armenian-American culture in New York City
Visual arts magazines published in the United States
Defunct literary magazines published in the United States
Magazines established in 1959
Magazines disestablished in 2008
Quarterly magazines published in the United States
Magazines published in New York City